The 1995 NCAA Division III men's basketball tournament was the 21st annual single-elimination tournament to determine the national champions of National Collegiate Athletic Association (NCAA) men's Division III collegiate basketball in the United States.

The field expanded to its current size and format of sixty-four teams allocated across four sectionals. The national semifinals, third-place final, and championship final were contested in Buffalo, New York.

Wisconsin–Platteville defeated Manchester (IN), 69–55, in the final, clinching their second national title (and first since 1991).

The Pioneers (31–0) were led by future Wisconsin coach Bo Ryan and were the first men's Division III program to complete an undefeated season since Potsdam in 1986.

Championship Rounds
Site: Buffalo, New York

See also
1995 NCAA Division I men's basketball tournament
1995 NCAA Division II men's basketball tournament
1995 NAIA Division I men's basketball tournament
1995 NAIA Division II men's basketball tournament
1995 NCAA Division III women's basketball tournament

References

NCAA Division III men's basketball tournament
NCAA Men's Division III Basketball
Ncaa Tournament